Pamorn Martdee (born 18 February 1988) also known as Pamorn Luuk Hill-Martdee is a former Thai of Australian descent muay Thai kickboxer, promoter of Origins Fight Promotions and the founder and director of Champions Gym in Perth. He is also the chairman of WBC Muaythai in Australia. Martdee was born in Subiaco, Western Australia. He was the WPMF (World Professional Muaythai Federation) welterweight Australian champion at age 17 and was ranked the number one contender in Australia to win the (World Boxing Council) WBC Muay Thai national title in 2007.

Personal life

Martdee is of Thai and New Zealand descent, with his father from Thailand and mother from New Zealand. He is the eldest of three children, having one younger sister and one younger brother. He is also fluent in two languages including English as his first language and Thai his second.

Training

Martdee began training at 12 years old under six time world champion "Iron fist" Sanapar Noi along with father Phon Martdee after realising the need for self defence and benefits of physical fitness for other sports such as soccer and Australian rules football in which Martdee had been playing from a young age.

From 15 to 19, Martdee went on to train at Saengmorakot Gym in Bangkok, Thailand learning the advanced Thai fighting techniques under the guidance of muay Thai trainer and Lumpinee Stadium promoter Jar Tui Saengmorakot.

Martdee has been trained by notable Thai fighters Marwin Nakorntongparkview, Rhino Pichitchai, Oley Sakonpetch, Tananchai Robocop and Tip Saengmorakot during his fight career.

Australian born fighters Andy Petrovic and Wayne Martinovich have also played a role in Martdee's career as assistant trainers.

Fight career

In 2002 Martdee fought against 16-year-old Steve Zankl for his debut. He won by unanimous decision. He also went on to win the 'Most Outstanding Fighter Award' for the event. Martdee and Zankl would fight again three times in the years to come.

Martdee's first 9 bouts were won by judges' decision staying undefeated, until facing Thailand's Kovid Thabtup in round one of the Thailand Competition Bangkok, 2004 where he lost by judges' decision. Thabtup would go on to win the gold medal for the competition.

2005 World Championships
At the Muay Thai World Championships in 2005, Martdee fought in the final against Russia's Mikel Kubaiyan, narrowly losing out to claim the silver medal on a judges' majority points decision in the junior division final.

Australian title
In 2005, Martdee would face Steve Zankl for the fourth and final time for the WPMF Australian Welterweight championship title. The bout was fought over five rounds where Martdee was cut on the head from a Zankl knee in round three. Martdee fought back and won the judges' unanimous decision to claim the vacant Welterweight Australian Title.

Thailand
In 2006, Pamorn went to live and train in Bangkok, Thailand. In April 2007 he fought on Saengmorakot Promotions at Bangkok's Lumpinee Stadium against England's Michael Harbone, a late replacement following the pulling out of his original Iranian opponent. Martdee would win by knockout in round four by punches after an accumulation of leg kicks and pressure earlier in the bout.

WBC Muaythai National Title
In 2007, Martdee fought for the WBC Muay Thai National Title against Yusha Ozhan. In a fast-paced bout the two exchanged blows with Martdee outclassing Ozhan for the majority of rounds one to five. It would be the last 20 seconds of the fifth round that Martdee's head hit the canvas following a heel trip from a caught kick. Regaining his footing but dazed and unsteady referee Dean Woodhams applied a standing eight count stopping the bout prematurely and awarding the WBC Muay Thai Welterweight National Title to Yusha Ozhan.

2009
Martdee made a return to the ring in May 2009 against Belarusian Parviz Iskenderov in a 3-round exhibition match on the Perth based promotion "World Boxing Council Muay Thai Battle Collossal VI" celebrating Australian Muay Thai Promotions 20 years of Muay Thai in Australia, despite his lack of fitness leading up to the bout.

Representing Australia
Martdee has represented Australia on seven separate occasions:

• 2004 AMAT Prince's Cup (National Stadium. Bangkok, Thailand)
• 2004 AMAT King's Cup (National Stadium. Bangkok, Thailand)
• 2005 WMF World Championships (National Stadium. Bangkok, Thailand)
• 2006 WMF World Championships (National Stadium. Bangkok, Thailand)
• 2007 WMF World Championships (National Stadium. Bangkok, Thailand)
• 2007 Seuk Saengmorakot (Lumpinee Stadium. Bangkok, Thailand)
• 2007 Thailand v The World (Bangla Stadium. Phuket, Thailand)

Promoter
Martdee made his debut as a promoter in 2011 with his first promotion working in association with Australian Muay Thai Promotions staging Battle Collossal Origins, 29 May 2011 held at the WA Italian Club in Perth with the main event between Andy Regan vs. Jamie "The Dragon" Lunghitano for the WBC Muay Thai Super Middleweight Western Australia State Title.

Origins Fight Promotions
Pamorn Martdee is the promoter of Origins Fight Promotions, a Perth-based fight series that promotes Muay Thai competition from around Western Australia. Events are staged two to three times per year.

On 8 March 2014, Martdee hosted Origins IV: Saenchai vs Hodgers at Kinsgway Indoor Stadium in Perth with Thai champion Saenchai Saenchai PKSaenchaimuaythaigym taking on Irishman Stephen Hodgers. Although the main event bout was changed at the last minute after a decision made by the Western Australian Professional Combat Sports Commission not allowing Saenchai to compete. Replacing Saenchai on 72 hours notice was Jak 300 (also known as Pinpetch Sangmorakot)

Jak 300 would go on to beat Hodgers by judges' decision. Saenchai was in attendance for the event.

WBC Muay Thai
In 2010 World Boxing Council Vice President and WBC Muay Thai president Police General Kovid Bhakdibhumi appointed Pamorn Martdee the WBC Muay Thai Australia/WBC Muaythai Asia Pacific Chairman to oversee competition and supervise activity within the country and region.

Champions Gym

In 2011, Martdee founded Champions Gym, located in Highgate, Western Australia. It was founded as a boutique martial arts centre designed for men and women of all ages and fitness levels to be able to train martial arts with courses in boxing, Muay Thai, Brazilian Jiu-Jitsu, mixed martial arts and Ladies Kick Fitness for fitness, self-defence and competition. Martdee is a boxing and Muay Thai coach alongside black belt champion William Dias (Nova União (mixed martial arts) / Goioerê BJJ) who coaches Brazilian jiu-jitsu, Whitney Tuna who coaches Ladies Kick Fitness and a number of other coaches.

References
WBC Muay Thai
Fight Results
Profile
Previous Discussion
Lumpinee Fight
WMA World Professional Muay Thai Association (formerly World Professional Muaythai Federation WPMF)
WMF (world Muay Thai Federation)
Reference
Reference2
Origins Fight Promotions Youtube Channel
Champions Gym
Goioerê BJJ

Australian male kickboxers
Welterweight kickboxers
Australian Muay Thai practitioners
Pamorn Martdee
Pamorn Martdee
Sportspeople from Perth, Western Australia
1988 births
Living people
Australian people of Thai descent